Mashhad-e Firuzkuh (also Romanized as Mashhad-e Fīrūzḵūh; also known as Mashhad) is a village in Abarshiveh Rural District, in the Central District of Damavand County, Tehran Province, Iran. At the 2006 census, its population was 154, in 54 families.

References 

Populated places in Damavand County